Very Annie Mary is a 2001 musical-comedy film, written and directed by Sara Sugarman and starring Rachel Griffiths and Jonathan Pryce. It is a coming-of-age tale, set in south Wales, about a woman in her 30s who lives with her verbally abusive father. It was filmed on location in Bridgend and at Workingman's Institute and Memorial Hall, Newbridge, Wales.

Premise
After her father suffers a stroke, a woman is forced to take care of him but uses the circumstances to emancipate herself and find the courage to sing once again.

Cast
 Rachel Griffiths as Annie Mary Pugh
 Jonathan Pryce as Jack Pugh 
 Ioan Gruffudd as Hob 
 Matthew Rhys as Nob
 Kenneth Griffith as Minister 
 Ruth Madoc as Mrs. Ifans
 Joanna Page as Bethan Bevan
 Anna Mountford as Blodwyn
 Josh Richards as Mr. Bevans
 Cerys Matthews as Nerys

Minor roles in the film are played by Ray Gravell, Mary Hopkin and Ruth Jones, among others.

Music
The film features the following songs:
 "Nessun Dorma"
 "Happy Birthday"
 "I Hear You Calling Me"
 "Come Back to Sorrento"
 "Oh I Do Like to Be Beside the Seaside"
 "Bohemian Rhapsody"
 "Dance Club"
 "We'll Keep a Welcome"
 "O mio babbino caro"
 "Love's Old Sweet Song"
 "Boum!"
 The Words of the "Sermon on the Mount" performed to the tune of "Living Doll" 
 "I'll Take You Home Again, Kathleen"
 "You Can't Get a Man with a Gun"
 "Cotton-Eyed Joe"
 "Hen Wlad Fy Nhadau"
 "Myfanwy"
 "We'll Gather Lilacs"
 "What's Love Got to Do with It"
 "Forever and Ever"
 "Whistling Bowery Boy"
 Bugeilio'r Gwenith Gwyn
 "Y.M.C.A." '93 Remix
 "O Sole Mio"
 "Don't Stop"
 "Dear Hearts and Gentle People"

Production
The film was shot in the middle of 1999, with filming taking place in the Garw Valley in Bridgend, Wales, posing as the fictional village of "Ogw" (a play on the name of the Ogmore Valley's Welsh name of Ogwr). It was scheduled to be presented at the 2000 Sundance Film Festival and the Dinard Festival of British Cinema but failed to show at either event.

Reception
The website's critical consensus reads, "An exercise in strained whimsy and saccharine sentiment." On Metacritic, the film has a weighted average score of 33 out of 100, based on 10 critics, indicating "generally unfavorable reviews".

Variety called it a "half-klutzy, half-engaging eccentric comedy...bolstered by good turns from leads Rachel Griffiths and Jonathan Pryce" but "falling prey to a general disorganization in tone and structure." The Guardian called it "a broad comedy with a very derivative Monty-ish plot, but likeable and good-natured." The New York Times called the film "alternately mushy and farcical" with an "undertone of satire" that keeps the film from "choking on its own cuteness"; it "churns up a few genuinely funny bits" including a climax "that is almost worth waiting for."

References

External links
 
 

British musical comedy films
Welsh-language films
2000s musical comedy films
British coming-of-age comedy films
2001 films
Films shot in Wales
Films set in Wales
Films produced by Graham Broadbent
Films scored by Stephen Warbeck
2001 comedy films
2000s coming-of-age comedy films
2000s English-language films
2000s British films